Abdul Taleb Zaki was an ethnic Hazara politician and a jihadist from Afghanistan.

Abdul Taleb Zaki, son of Abdul Wahid born in 1960 in Bamiyan Province of Afghanistan.
He is one of the jihadists of Hezbe Wahdat political party in Afghanistan.
He was the governor of Bamiyan Province for four years from 1994 to 1998. He died in 1998 in Ghazni Province.

References 

1960 births
1998 deaths
Hazara politicians
Hezbe Wahdat politicians
People from Bamyan Province